CTRC may refer to:

Buffalo Central Terminal Restoration Corporation
California Trolley and Railroad Corporation, a preserved railroad and museum in the Santa Clara valley
Cancer Therapy & Research Center, an academic research and treatment center in Texas
Computing-Tabulating-Recording Company, a company renamed International Business Machines in 1924
Cyber Terror Response Center, a cybercrime section of the South Korean police
CTRC (gene), which encodes the enzyme chymotrypsin-C